Autonomedia is a nonprofit publisher based in Williamsburg, Brooklyn known for publishing works of criticism. As of 2003 they were staffed by volunteers and had published over 200 books, usually with 3,000 of each run. 

As of 2003 its most well-known book was Hakim Bey's essays on autonomy, Temporary Autonomous Zone. When Bey died in 2022 it was still one of the publisher's bestsellers with sales of over 50,000. 

Circa 1982, Autonomedia became the parent publisher for Semiotext(e), an imprint known for publishing translations of French post-structuralist literature.

References

External links 
 

Book publishing companies based in New York City
Anarchist organizations in the United States
Political book publishing companies
Anarchist publishing companies
1982 establishments in New York City